In 1953, the Puerto Rico Department of Transportation and Public Works implemented a major renumbering of its insular highways. Before 1953, highway routes were numbered in the 1 to just over 100 range and were distributed randomly throughout the island, resulting in several routes with long road lengths. The numbering system adopted in 1953, which is in use today, increased the range of route numbers from the just-over-100 to 999, resulting in a decrease in the length of many routes. This new numbering system follows a grid pattern for highways numbered between 100 and 999, with the lower numbered roads found to the west and systematically increasing towards 999 as the traveler moves easterly. Although PR-1, PR-2 and PR-3 routes had notable changes in some of their segments, these three are the only highways that kept their route numbers intact due to their interregional prominence.

History
The first major roadways in Puerto Rico were built by the Government of Spain. By 1898, the year when Puerto Rico was ceded by Spain to the United States,  of roadways had been built. By March 1928, there were 12 districts and some highway routes, particularly routes number 1, 2 and 3, crossed multiple districts. Some of the highways within the 12 districts included:

Highway numbers

See also

 List of highways in Ponce, Puerto Rico

Notes

References

External links
 Map of the island of Porto Rico (1915)
 La correspondencia de Puerto Rico, March 15, 1906, Image 2
 Topographic map of the Island of Vieques, Puerto Rico, copy 1 (1946)
 Revista de Obras Públicas de Puerto Rico, La Carretera Central (1929–1930)
 Colección Puertorriqueña UPR RP, Revista de Obras Públicas de Puerto Rico (1924–1936)

 
1953 in transport
1953 in Puerto Rico
History of Puerto Rico
Highway renumbering in the United States